GBLD-345 is an anxiolytic drug used in scientific research, which acts as a non-selective, full-efficacy positive allosteric modulator of the GABAA receptor. It has similar effects to benzodiazepine drugs, but is structurally distinct and so is classed as a nonbenzodiazepine anxiolytic.

References 

Anxiolytics
Aromatic amines
Ethers
Phenol ethers
Anilines
GABAA receptor positive allosteric modulators